Cindy Cowan is an American film producer and songwriter.

Cowan graduated from Tulane University and attended graduate courses toward a master's degree in psychology at Harvard. Her producing career began as a producer and writer for a CBS News affiliate in Miami, Florida.

In 1995, Cowan co-founded Initial Entertainment Group (IEG) with Graham King. During her tenure as president, IEG had successes that included: an Emmy nomination for Rent-A-Kid starring Leslie Nielsen; Emmy, Golden Globe and People's Choice nominations for If These Walls Could Talk; a United Nations Award for Savior starring Dennis Quaid; and Oscar-winning Traffic starring Michael Douglas. Additional projects produced by Cowan included Very Bad Things and Robert Altman's Dr. T & the Women.

In 1999, Cowan sold her two-thirds stake in IEG to Splendid Films and started Cindy Cowan Entertainment where she produced Scorched, Fifty Dead Men Walking, and Red Lights starring Robert De Niro and Sigourney Weaver.

As a songwriter and lyricist, Cowan has written songs for film and television; an album title track for Engelbert Humperdinck, a chart topping hit "This Love is Forever" for Howard Hewett, and several songs for Pamala Stanley.

References

External links

Cindy Cowan Entertainment
Daily Variety

American film producers
Tulane University alumni
Harvard Graduate School of Arts and Sciences alumni
Living people
American women songwriters
Year of birth missing (living people)
American women film producers
21st-century American women